Christmas Love Duets is an collaborative compilation album of Christmas music put together for the Christmas season by Filipino actor and singer Daniel Padilla with actress Kathryn Bernardo under Star Records. The album features six songs with minus one including Jackson 5's "Give Love on Christmas Day," "Perfect Christmas," Judy Garland's "Have Yourself A Merry Little Christmas," "The Little Christmas Tree," Stevie Wonder's "Someday At Christmas," and John Lennon's "Happy Xmas (War Is Over)".

The album peaked at No. 1 on the Odyssey Music & Video's nationwide sales reports (overall). The title track, "Perfect Christmas", earned a nomination at the 29th Awit Awards for Best Christmas Recording.

Promotion and reception
Astroplus on Twitter revealed the pre order of this album On November 31, 2015"Christmas Love Duets" album launched on December 20, 2015 5pm at SM City Fairview Atrium, including meet and greet with Padilla and Bernardo. During the launched they sang "Give Love On Christmas Day" and  A Perfect Christmas

The album hit No. 1 on the Odyssey Music & Video’s nationwide sales reports overall for the week of December 14–20, 2015  While the title track, Perfect Christmas nominated at 29th Awit Awards for Best Christmas Recording.

Track listing

Personnel

 Malou N. Santos & Roxy Liquigan – Executive Producers
 Jonathan Manalo – A&R/Supervising Producer/Audio Content Head/
 Roque 'Rox' B. Santos – Over-all Album Producer
 Marivic Benedicto – Star Song, inc and New Media Head
 Regie Sandel – Sales and Distribution
 Jayson Sarmiento – Promo Specialist
 Jholina Luspo – Promo Associate
 London Angeles – Promo Coordinator
 Beth Faustio – Music Publishing Officer
 Eaizen Almazan – New Media Technical Assistant
 Abbey Aledo – Music Servicing Officer
 Andrew Castillo – Creative Head
 Christine Joy L. Cheng – Album layout Designer
 Marc Nicdao – Photographer
 John Valle, Denise Go Ochoa & Ryan Ko – Hair Make-up Artist
 Ton Lao – Stylist
 Dante Tañedo - Album Master

Charts

Weekly charts

Release history

External links

References

Star Music albums
Daniel Padilla albums
2015 Christmas albums
Pop Christmas albums